Harry Henry Vahrenhorst (February 13, 1885 to October 10, 1943) was a Major League Baseball player who played in  with the St. Louis Browns.

He died in St. Louis, Missouri in 1943 of pulmonary tuberculosis.

References

External links

1885 births
1943 deaths
Baseball players from Missouri
St. Louis Browns players
Jackson Senators players